São Martinho de Árvore e Lamarosa (officially União das Freguesias de São Martinho de Árvore e Lamarosa) is a civil parish in the municipality of Coimbra, Portugal. The population in 2011 was 3,102, in an area of 20.88 km2. It was formed on 28 January 2013 by the merging of freguesias São Martinho de Árvore and Lamarosa.

References 

Freguesias of Coimbra